The Kangean tit-babbler (Mixornis prillwitzi) is a species of bird in the family Timaliidae. It is endemic to the Kangean Islands.

Its natural habitat is subtropical or tropical moist lowland forest.

References

Mixornis
Birds of Indonesia
Birds described in 1901
Taxa named by Ernst Hartert